Kenneth Wootson Duke (born January 29, 1969) is an American professional golfer who plays on the PGA Tour Champions. He formerly played on the PGA Tour, with his sole victory coming at the 2013 Travelers Championship.

Early life
Duke was born in Hope, Arkansas, the son of Ray and Bettie Duke. As a seventh grader in Arkadelphia, Arkansas, he was diagnosed with scoliosis; it was determined that his spine had a curvature of over 26 percent, and he wore a back brace 23 hours a day. Duke had surgery two years later after it was determined that his spine had a 51 percent curvature. At Arkansas Children's Hospital in Little Rock, on February 25, 1985, the day of the surgery, Duke's spine was at 72 degrees and worsening. Once a 16-inch metal rod was attached to his spine, the curve of Duke's back was set at 38 degrees, within the range of normal, and that's where it has stayed ever since. Months later, back playing for Arkadelphia High School, he won medalist honors in a high school district golf tournament while wearing a back brace. In 1987, he was the Arkansas High School Medalist at Pleasant Valley Country Club in Little Rock.

Duke played his college golf at Division II Henderson State University. Duke led the Reddies to four straight Arkansas Intercollegiate Conference titles and was a four-time AIC Golfer of the Year. In 1992, he earned NAIA All-American honors

Professional career
After turning professional in 1994, Duke bounced around the world playing mini-tours and on the Asian Tour, South American Tour, and the Canadian Tour. In 1999, he won twice on the Canadian Tour and led their Order of Merit. Duke first played on what was then the Nike Tour in 1995 and qualified for the PGA Tour in 2004, but failed to keep his card and returned to the Nationwide Tour. In 2006 he finished at the top of the Nationwide Tour money list and won the BMW Charity Pro-Am at The Cliffs, which regained his playing rights on the PGA Tour for 2007.

After a slow start to the 2007 season, Duke hit a run of good form in the spring, with four consecutive top 10 finishes, elevating Duke into the top 100 of the Official World Golf Rankings.

At the 2011 Nationwide Tour Championship, Duke secured his PGA Tour card with a win. He jumped from 36th on the Tour's money list to seventh.

On June 23, 2013, in his 187th start and after three runner-up finishes in his career, Duke broke through to win his first event on the PGA Tour at the Travelers Championship. He beat Chris Stroud with a birdie on the second extra hole of a sudden-death playoff. He entered the final round two shots back of the leaders, but shot a final round 66 to take the lead in the clubhouse before Stroud chipped in on the final green to force a playoff. In the playoff, after both players made par on the first extra hole, Duke played his approach to within three feet. Stroud, who was about 30 feet away, could not make a birdie, leaving Duke to convert from three feet for his first PGA Tour victory. He also reached a career-best world ranking of 70th after his win.

In the 2016 Players Championship, Duke shot a 65 during the third round on Saturday May 14, 2016. Conditions were very difficult that day and this round was subsequently viewed as one of the best rounds ever played at TPC Sawgrass. “What course was Ken Duke playing today? Can anyone tell me? Was he playing across the road?” said Jason Day after his third-round 73. “I think that should be the course record.” "The greens were the fastest I've ever putted," said Russell Knox. "I looked up on the board and saw Ken Duke shot 65 and was like, what? That's the best round of golf ever, probably." He finished tied for third in the tournament, winning $504,000.

Duke was one of the last players to retain his Tour card via earnings, an exemption the PGA Tour ended prior to the 2017–18 season. Duke was unable to retain full Tour status after the season and became eligible for PGA Tour Champions in January 2019.

Professional wins (5)

PGA Tour wins (1)

PGA Tour playoff record (1–0)

Nationwide Tour wins (2)

Nationwide Tour playoff record (0–1)

Canadian Tour wins (2)

Results in major championships

CUT = missed the half-way cut
"T" = tied

Summary

Most consecutive cuts made – 4 (2007 U.S. Open – 2009 Masters)
Longest streak of top-10s – 0

Results in The Players Championship

CUT = missed the halfway cut
"T" indicates a tie for a place

Results in World Golf Championships

"T" = Tied

Results in senior major championships

"T" indicates a tie for a place
CUT = missed the halfway cut
NT = No tournament due to COVID-19 pandemic

See also
2003 PGA Tour Qualifying School graduates
2006 Nationwide Tour graduates
2011 Nationwide Tour graduates

References

External links

American male golfers
PGA Tour golfers
Korn Ferry Tour graduates
Golfers from Arkansas
Golfers from Florida
People from Hope, Arkansas
People from Palm City, Florida
1969 births
Living people